LPG is an American Christian hip-hop duo from Whittier, CaliforniaWest Covina, California and part of the underground hip hop collective Tunnel Rats. It is composed of cousins Dax Reynosa (also known as Theory) and Jurny Big (also known as Phil Harmonic). Their name was understood to stand for "Lord's Personal Gangsters", but now is "Living Proof of Grace". They released their first album: Earthworm, in 1995.

Along with Tunnel Rats, they had trouble being accepted by conservatives in the Christian ranks. "There were years of toiling and being called the devil," said Reynosa. "We are ministers of the gospel, but we just happen to rap."

Discography 
 The Earthworm (Brainstorm Artists International, 1995)
 360 Degrees (Solar Music, 1998)
The Gadfly (Uprok Records, 2003)

References

External links
 Uprok Records
 Last.fm

Christian hip hop groups
Hip hop groups from California
Underground hip hop groups

Tunnel Rats (music group) members
Musical groups established in 1984
Musical groups from Whittier, California